The 2019 OFC Beach Soccer Nations Cup was the sixth edition of the OFC Beach Soccer Nations Cup (previously called the OFC Beach Soccer Championship), the premier beach soccer tournament contested by Oceanian men's national teams, organised by the Oceania Football Confederation (OFC). The competition returns after a six-year absence.

The tournament took place in Aorai Tini Hau, Papeete, Tahiti from 17 to 22 June 2019. It was originally scheduled to take place from 15 to 22 September 2018 in Pā'ōfa'i Gardens. However, in August 2018, it was announced that the tournament had been postponed until June 2019 in order to allow more teams to participate.

The tournament also acted as the qualification tournament for Oceanian teams to the 2019 FIFA Beach Soccer World Cup in Paraguay; the winners qualified.

The Solomon Islands were the defending champions, but lost in the final and so did not qualify.

Teams
Thierry Ariiotima, president of the FTF, stated that the championship's new 2019 scheduling would allow at least six nations to enter the event. Eventually five teams were confirmed.

Venue
The matches will be played at the Aorai Tini Hau in Papeete.

Squads

Draw
The draw of the tournament was held on 9 April 2019 in Tahiti, at a beach soccer match between Tiki Tama and Green Warriors during the Festival des îles.

Group stage
Each team earns three points for a win in regulation time, two points for a win in extra time, one point for a win in a penalty shoot-out, and no points for a defeat. The top two teams advance to the final, while the next two teams advance to the third place match.

All times are local, TAHT (UTC−10).

Final stage

Bracket

Third place match

Final

Tahiti qualifies for the 2019 FIFA Beach Soccer World Cup.

Qualified teams for FIFA Beach Soccer World Cup
The following team from OFC qualify for the 2019 FIFA Beach Soccer World Cup.

1 Bold indicates champions for that year. Italic indicates hosts for that year.

References

External links
OFC Beach Soccer Nations Cup 2019, 
News > OFC Beach Soccer Nations Cup 2019, oceaniafootball.com
OFC Beach Soccer Nations Cup, at Beach Soccer Worldwide

2019
Ofc
2019 in beach soccer
Beach Soccer Nations Cup
International association football competitions hosted by French Polynesia
Beach Soccer Nations Cup
June 2019 sports events in Oceania